José Alegría (born 5 October 1980) is a Peruvian retired footballer.

He holds the MLS record for fastest red card in league history, earning one in 18 seconds during a match on 13 June 2001.

Career
Born in Lima, he moved to the United States when he was 12 and grew up in Springfield, Virginia.

He was initially signed by D.C. United directly out of high school in 1998. However, after participating in their spring training, he was forced to return to Peru in order to obtain a work visa. The process was delayed because he overstayed his initial tourist visa limit and he missed both the 1999 and 2000 seasons as a result. While waiting in Peru, Alegría trained with Alianza Lima, the country's most successful team, and played in the second division.

He joined D.C. United in October 2001 and made 38 league appearances across three seasons with the team, registering one goal and three assists before he was waived in early 2004.

References

External links
 Jose Alegria at MLSsoccer.com
 

Living people
1980 births
Peruvian footballers
Association football midfielders
D.C. United players
Major League Soccer players
Footballers from Lima
Soccer players from Virginia
People from Springfield, Virginia
Peruvian emigrants to the United States